Cilostazol, sold under the brand name Pletal among others, is a medication used to help the symptoms of intermittent claudication in peripheral vascular disease. If no improvement is seen after 3 months, stopping the medication is reasonable. It may also be used to prevent stroke. It is taken by mouth.

Common side effects include headache, diarrhea, dizziness, and cough. Serious side effects may include decreased survival in those with heart failure, low platelets, and low white blood cells. Cilostazol is a phosphodiesterase 3 inhibitor which works by inhibiting platelet aggregation and dilating arteries.

Cilostazol was approved for medical use in the United States in 1999. It is available as a generic medication. In 2019, it was the 347th most commonly prescribed medication in the United States, with more than 800thousand prescriptions.

Medical uses
Cilostazol is approved for the treatment of intermittent claudication in the United States and United Kingdom.

Cilostazol is also used for secondary stroke prevention, though to date no regulatory body has approved it specifically for that indication.

Heart failure
Cilostazol is dangerous for people with severe heart failure. Cilostazol has been studied in people without heart failure, without evidence of harm, but much more data would be needed to determine no risk exists. Although cilostazol would not be approvable for a trivial condition the Cardio-Renal Advisory Committee and FDA concluded that fully informed patients and physicians should be able to choose to use it to treat intermittent claudication. Patient and physician labeling will describe the basis for concern and the incomplete information available.

Adverse effects
Possible side effects of cilostazol use include headache (the most common), diarrhea, severe heat intolerance, abnormal stools, increased heart rate, and palpitations.

Interactions 

Cilostazol is metabolized by CYP3A4 and CYP2C19, two isoenzymes of the cytochrome P450 system. Drugs that inhibit CYP3A4, such as itraconazole, erythromycin, ketoconazole, and diltiazem, are known to interact with cilostazol. The proton pump inhibitor omeprazole, an inhibitor of CYP2C19, increases exposure to the active metabolite of cilostazol.

A single report has been made of grapefruit juice possibly increasing the effects of cilostazol; some drug information sources list this as a possible interaction. The FDA-approved labeling of cilostazol notes that grapefruit juice (which is a CYP3A4 inhibitor) increases the drug's maximum concentration by around 50%.

Mechanism
Cilostazol is a selective inhibitor of phosphodiesterase type 3 (PDE3) with therapeutic focus on increasing cAMP. An increase in cAMP results in an increase in the active form of protein kinase A (PKA), which is directly related with an inhibition in platelet aggregation. PKA also prevents the activation of an enzyme (myosin light-chain kinase) that is important in the contraction of smooth muscle cells, thereby exerting its vasodilatory effect.

References

External links 
 

CYP3A4 inhibitors
Wikipedia medicine articles ready to translate
Antiplatelet drugs
Vasodilators
Tetrazoles
2-Quinolone ethers at the benzene ring
PDE3 inhibitors
Otsuka Pharmaceutical
Cyclohexyl compounds
Delta-lactams